Vander may refer to:

Names
van der, a variant of van in Dutch names

People

Christian Vander (born 1948), French musician
Musetta Vander (born 1969), South African actress and model
Roberto Vander, Dutch-Mexican actor and singer
Vander Blue, American basketball player
Vander (footballer, born 1990), full name Vander Luiz Silva Souza, Brazilian football attacking midfielder
Vander Vieira (born 1988), Brazilian football winger
Vander Von Odd, drag performer and winner of The Boulet Brothers' Dragula (season 1)

Places

Vander, North Carolina